A nazar (from Arabic  , meaning 'sight', 'surveillance', 'attention', and other related concepts) is an eye-shaped amulet believed to protect against the evil eye. The term is also used in Azerbaijani, Bengali, Hebrew, Hindi, Kurdish, Pashto, Persian, Punjabi, Turkish, Urdu and other languages. In Persian and Afghan folklore, it is called a cheshm nazar or nazar qurbāni. In India and Pakistan, the Hindi-Urdu slogan chashm-e-baddoor is used to ward off the evil eye. In the Indian subcontinent, the phrase nazar lag gai is used to indicate that one has been affected by the evil eye. 

It is commonly believed that the evil eye can be given in the guise of a compliment, signifying its connection to the destructive power of envy (for one's wealth, beauty etc.). Amulets such as the nazar are used in accordance with common sayings such as "an eye for an eye", where another eye can be used to protect the recipient of the malefic gaze. The evil eye causes its victim to become unwell the next day, unless a protective phrase such as "with the will of God" (mashallah in Arabic) is recited. Among adherents of Hinduism and Islam in South Asia, when a mother observes that her child is being excessively complimented, it is common for them to attempt to neutralize the effects of the evil eye (nazar utarna) by "holding red chilies in one hand and circling the child's head a few times, then burning the chilies."

It originated in Mesopotamia and was first brought to Mediterranean countries through trade. 

Amulet

A typical nazar is made of handmade glass featuring concentric circles or teardrop shapes in dark blue, white, light blue and black, occasionally with a yellow/gold edge.

Eye bead 

The Turkish boncuk (sometimes called a göz boncuğu or eye bead) is a glass bead characterized by a blue glass field with a blue or black dot superimposed on a white or yellow center. Historically old, the blue bead has gained importance as an item of popular culture in Modern Turkey. The bead probably originated in the Mediterranean and is associated with the development of glass making. Written documents and extant beads date as early as the 16th century BC. Glass beads were made and widely used throughout the ancient world: from Mesopotamia to Egypt, from Carthage and Phoenicia to Persia, and throughout the Roman imperial period.

Gallery

See also 
 God's eye
 Evil eye
 Darśana
 Eyespot (mimicry)
 Görece, Menderes
 Hamsa
 Nazar battu
 Skandola
 Ta'wiz

References

Sources

External links
 
 

Talismans
Amulets
Turkish words and phrases
Occultism (Islam)
Superstitions of Asia
Superstitions of Europe
Turkish culture
Magic symbols
Arabic words and phrases